Benjamin Marc Williamson (born 25 December 1988) is an English footballer who plays as a striker for  club Concord Rangers.

He played for Worthing in 2009, before joining the Glenn Hoddle Academy in Spain the following year, where he had a spell with the academy's partner club, Jerez Industrial. In 2011, he returned to England to join Bournemouth, where he featured in the south-coast club's play-off semi final against Huddersfield Town. He joined Port Vale on a season-long loan from Hyde in June 2011, which was made permanent the following year. He helped the club to secure promotion out of League Two in 2012–13. He moved to Gillingham in June 2015, and then signed with Cambridge United in January 2016 following a brief loan spell. He joined Eastleigh in August 2017. After just over two years with Eastleigh, he switched to Bromley in November 2019. He spent the first half of the 2021–22 season with Dover Athletic, before signing with Concord Rangers in January 2022.

Career

Early career
Born in London, Williamson played youth football for Millwall and Croydon Athletic, before signing for Worthing of the Isthmian League Division One South in August 2009. In November 2009, Williamson attended a four-week trial at the Glenn Hoddle Academy. He was invited to the academy partly by chance, as Academy scouts had been watching Worthing teammate Ross Treleaven when Williamson scored a hat-trick and unwittingly alerted them to his potential.

The Glenn Hoddle Academy
He signed a two-year contract with the academy in the summer of 2010, and was selected to play for nearby Spanish side Jerez Industrial following the academy's takeover of the club. During the first half of the 2010–11 season, he played twelve games for the club, scoring eight goals. After he left the club, Jerez struggled, and suffered relegation at the end of the season. Back at the academy, Glenn Hoddle focused on improving Williamson's technique, especially in his left foot.

Bournemouth
On 31 January 2011, he joined League One club Bournemouth on a deal lasting until the end of the season. He made his debut on 5 February, appearing as an injury time substitute in a 1–1 draw with Leyton Orient. An ankle injury restricted him to just four further substitute appearances, including a brief appearance in the club's play-off semi-final draw with Huddersfield Town, coming on in the last minute replacing Danny Ings.

Hyde to Port Vale
In June 2011 he turned down a new deal at Bournemouth as manager Lee Bradbury could not guarantee regular first team football. He joined Conference North outfit Hyde, but was loaned out to Micky Adams' Port Vale in League Two on a season long loan.

He got off the mark with his first Football League goals on 17 September, as he 'displayed athleticism, composure, bravery and a poacher's instinct' to score with a lob and then a header in a 3–2 home defeat to Shrewsbury Town. He made six starts and eight substitute appearances in the club's first fifteen games of the season. However, he damaged his knee in a reserve game at Derby County on 31 October, and was sidelined for several weeks. Vale failed to score a single goal in the five matches that he missed, though he had to wait until boxing day before he made his return to first team action. A stoppage time strike against Oxford United seconds before the end of the 2011–12 season gave Williamson a tally of three goals in 35 league games (12 starts and 23 substitute appearances). He signed a new one-year contract with the club in May 2012.

He began the 2012–13 season making regular appearances from the bench, and his tendency to score important goals led to him being labelled as a "super-sub". He was favoured ahead of Louis Dodds for the first time against Northampton Town on 27 October, but was taken off for tactical reasons early into the match after defender John McCombe was sent off. He then returned to bench duty, and sealed his super-sub status with the winning goal against Forest Green Rovers in the First Round of the FA Cup. He then scored two goals in two starts at the end of November. However the arrival of Lee Hughes in the January transfer window meant that competition to partner the league's top-goalscorer in Tom Pope was fierce, and Williamson was mainly used as an impact player. He ended the campaign on nine goals in his 39 appearances, as Vale secured promotion with a third-place finish, and agreed to sign a new two-year contract in the summer.

Williamson scored six goals in 46 appearances in the 2013–14 campaign, helping the club to a ninth-place finish in League One. On 12 August 2014, Williamson scored his first career hat-trick during Port Vale's 6–2 League Cup victory over Hartlepool United. New manager Rob Page went on to say that Williamson was an important player in Page's tactics, his pace being useful to "create gaps for clever players like Dany N'Guessan, Mark Marshall and Louis Dodds". Page played him as the lone striker in a 4–5–1 formation. He ended the 2014–15 season with nine goals in 47 games.

Gillingham
Williamson rejected the offer of a new contract at Port Vale and instead signed a two-year contract with League One rivals Gillingham in June 2015. Manager Justin Edinburgh said the powerful striker would add a different dimension to the team's attack force. However, he made only four league starts for the club as manager Justin Edinburgh preferred to play Luke Norris, Rory Donnelly and Dominic Samuel.

Cambridge United
On 19 November 2015, Williamson joined Cambridge United on a six-week loan deal. He scored three goals in his first four appearances for Shaun Derry's "U's". Though he failed to find the net in the remaining four games of his loan spell, he still did enough to win a permanent transfer to Cambridge in January for an undisclosed fee. He was named on the Football League team of the week after scoring two goals and claiming an assist in a 3–1 victory at Leyton Orient, ably filling the gap left by a long-term injury to top-scorer Barry Corr. He again won a place on the team of the week after ending Yeovil Town run of five clean sheets with a brace during a 3–0 win at the Abbey Stadium on 19 March.

Speaking in February 2017, manager Shaun Derry said that Williamson had to "grasp that opportunity" after starting just four of the club's last 20 fixtures. Derry went on to say that Williamson had "enthusiasm for training... [and] his work rate... [won him] the respect of the whole football club" but that ultimately "you only get judged on the goals you score and the facts of the matter are Ben hasn't scored enough goals this year". He scored just one goal in 43 appearances throughout the 2016–17 campaign and was released in May 2017.

Eastleigh
On 2 August 2017, Williamson signed with National League club Eastleigh. Manager Richard Hill said that "I'm delighted to secure the services of Ben, especially with a list of National League teams after him". He scored ten goals in 37 appearances for the "Spitfires" across the 2017–18 campaign and was retained by new manager Andy Hessenthaler. He scored seven goals in 40 appearances throughout the 2018–19 season, helping Eastleigh to reach the play-off semi-finals, where they were beaten by Salford City on penalties. He was offered a new contract in the summer by manager Ben Strevens.

Bromley
On 22 November 2019, Williamson was signed by Eastleigh's National League rivals Bromley. He scored 14 minutes into his "Ravens" debut the following day, in a 2–0 win over Sutton United. He scored two goals in 18 appearances in the 2019–20 season, which was permanently suspended on 26 March due to the COVID-19 pandemic in England, with Bromley in 13th-place. He scored three goals in 35 league games during the 2020–21 campaign, including the goal that secured a 1–0 win over Notts County and play-off place on the last day of the season. Bromley lost 3–2 at Hartlepool United in the play-off quarter-finals and Williamson was substituted at half-time.

Dover Athletic
On 24 June 2021, Williamson joined National League side Dover Athletic in a move that reunited him with former Eastleigh boss Andy Hessenthaler. A first goal for the club came from the penalty spot with the first of two equalisers in a 5–2 defeat to Stockport County. He scored two goals in 25 games in the first half of the 2021–22 season before he left the club by mutual consent on 26 January.

Concord Rangers
On 29 January 2022, Williamson signed for National League South side Concord Rangers. On 12 February, he was named in the Non-League Paper's team of the week after he scored in a 3–1 home win over Havant & Waterlooville. However this was his only goal in seventeen appearances for the "Beach Boys" in the second half of the 2021–22 season.

Style of play
Neil Duncanson, commercial director at the Glenn Hoddle Academy said "Ben is a good striker, with a good eye for goal He has fantastic movement off the ball and the pace to take on any defender". After his arrival at Port Vale, manager Micky Adams stated "Ben is a quick striker". Strike partner Tom Pope further said that "he's strong, quick, has a lot of attributes... [and is] going to have a good career". Veteran striker Lee Hughes stated that "he has terrific pace, he's really powerful, his movement is great and he has awareness too".

Personal life
Williamson studied Mathematics & Business studies at the University of Brighton. He is a lifelong Arsenal supporter.

Career statistics

Honours
Port Vale
League Two third-place promotion: 2012–13

References

External links
Ben Williamson at My Football Data

1988 births
Living people
Footballers from Lambeth
English footballers
English expatriate footballers
Association football forwards
Worthing F.C. players
Expatriate footballers in Spain
English expatriate sportspeople in Spain
Jerez Industrial CF players
AFC Bournemouth players
Hyde United F.C. players
Port Vale F.C. players
Gillingham F.C. players
Cambridge United F.C. players
Eastleigh F.C. players
Bromley F.C. players
Dover Athletic F.C. players
Concord Rangers F.C. players
English Football League players
Isthmian League players
Tercera División players
National League (English football) players
Alumni of the University of Brighton